The term strategic direction may refer to:

strategic management
strategic direction in the Soviet Army